WebP is an image file format developed by Google intended as a replacement for JPEG, PNG, and GIF file formats. It supports both lossy and lossless compression, as well as animation and alpha transparency.

Google announced the WebP format in September 2010, and released the first stable version of its supporting library in April 2018.

History 

WebP was first announced by Google on 30 September in 2010 as a new open format for lossy compressed true-color graphics on the web, producing files that were smaller than JPEG files for comparable image quality. It was based on technology which Google had acquired with the purchase of On2 Technologies. As a derivative of the VP8 video format, it is a sister project to the WebM multimedia container format. WebP-related software is released under a BSD free software license.

On 3 October 2011, Google added an "Extended File Format" allowing WebP support for animation, ICC profile, XMP and Exif metadata, and tiling (compositing very large images from maximum 16384×16384 tiles). Older animated GIF files can be converted to animated WebP.

On 18 November 2011, Google announced a new lossless compression mode, and support for transparency (alpha channel) in both lossless and lossy modes; support was enabled by default in libwebp 0.2.0 (16 August 2012). According to Google's measurements in November 2011, a conversion from PNG to WebP resulted in a 45% reduction in file size when starting with PNGs found on the web, and a 28% reduction compared to PNGs that are recompressed with pngcrush and PNGOUT.

In July 2016, Apple added WebP support to early beta versions of macOS Sierra and iOS 10, but support was later removed in the GM seed versions of iOS 10 and macOS Sierra released in September 2016. In September 2020, WebP support was added in Safari version 14.

The supporting libwebp library reached version 1.0 in April 2018.

As of November 2021, web browsers that support WebP had 96% market share.

Technology 

WebP's lossy compression algorithm is based on the intra-frame coding of the VP8 video format and the Resource Interchange File Format (RIFF) as a container format. As such, it is a block-based transformation scheme with eight bits of color depth and a luminance–chrominance model with chroma subsampling by a ratio of 1:2 (YCbCr 4:2:0). Without further content, the mandatory RIFF container has an overhead of only twenty bytes, though it can also hold additional metadata. The side length of WebP images is limited to  pixels.

WebP is based on block prediction. Each block is predicted on the values from the three blocks above it and from one block to the left of it (block decoding is done in raster-scan order: left to right and top to bottom). There are four basic modes of block prediction: horizontal, vertical, DC (one color), and TrueMotion. Mispredicted data and non-predicted blocks are compressed in a 4×4 pixel sub-block with a discrete cosine transform or a Walsh–Hadamard transform. Both transforms are done with fixed-point arithmetic to avoid rounding errors. The output is compressed with entropy encoding. WebP also has explicit support for parallel decoding.

The reference implementation consists of converter software in the form of a command-line program for Linux (cwebp) and a programming library for the decoding, the same as for WebM. The open-source community ported the converter to other platforms, such as Windows.

The WebP container (i.e., RIFF container for WebP) allows feature support over and above the basic use case of WebP (i.e., a file containing a single image encoded as a VP8 key frame). The WebP container provides additional support for:
 Metadata An image may have metadata stored in Exif or XMP formats.
 Transparency An image may have transparency, i.e., an alpha channel.
 Color profile An image may have an embedded ICC profile as described by the International Color Consortium.

Lossless compression
WebP's lossless compression, a newer algorithm unrelated to VP8, was designed by Google software engineer Jyrki Alakuijala. It uses advanced techniques such as dedicated entropy codes for different color channels, exploiting 2D locality of backward reference distances and a color cache of recently used colors. This complements basic techniques such as dictionary coding, Huffman coding and color indexing transform. This format uses a recursive definition: all of the control images, such as the local entropy code selection, are encoded the same way as the whole image itself.

Animation 
Google has proposed using WebP for animated images as an alternative to the popular GIF format, citing the advantages of 24-bit color with transparency, combining frames with lossy and lossless compression in the same animation, and support for seeking to specific frames. Google reports a 64% reduction in file size for images converted from animated GIFs to lossy WebP, however, with a very noticeable visual impact, both at default settings, and optimised settings. When converting using lossless WebP, a 19% reduction is achieved as reported by Google, although real world performance is nearer to 10%.

Support

Web browsers
Google actively promotes WebP, and Google Chrome and all Chromium-based browsers support the format. The proprietary PageSpeed Insights tool suggests that webmasters switch from JPEG and PNG to WebP in order to improve their website speed score.

Microsoft Edge versions released after January 2020 are based on the Chromium browser, and have native WebP support. EdgeHTML-based versions of Microsoft Edge support WebP through a platform extension (installed by default) (unless running in the security-hardened "Application Guard" mode, which does not support platform extensions).

Safari added support for WebP in 2020 with iOS 14 and macOS Big Sur.

Mozilla Firefox (and its forks Pale Moon and Waterfox) officially supports WebP since January 2019. It was initially considered for implementation in 2013.

GNOME Web, Midori, and Falkon natively support WebP.

WebP can also be displayed in all major browsers using the WebPJS JavaScript library, although support in Internet Explorer 6 and above is achieved using Flash.

Support for WebP was added to Links in version 2.26.

Graphics software
Acorn (from version 7.0), Picasa (from version 3.9), PhotoLine, Pixelmator, ImageMagick, XnView, IrfanView, GDAL, Aseprite, Paint.NET (from version 4.2.5), GIMP (from version 2.10), gThumb (from version 3.1.1), Xara Designer Pro (from version 18.0), Adobe Photoshop (from version 23.2) and GraphicConverter all natively support WebP.

In 2019, Google released a free plug-in that enables WebP support in earlier versions of Adobe Photoshop. Free Photoshop plug-ins had been released by Telegraphics and fnordware before that. GIMP up to version 2.8 also supported WebP via a plugin; later, this plugin was shipped in GIMP 2.9 branch, and received multiple improvements. Google has also released a plug-in for Microsoft Windows that enables WebP support in Windows Photo Viewer, Microsoft Office 2010, FastPictureViewer, and any other application that uses Windows Imaging Component. Blender supports WebP since version 3.2.

Other programs 
FFmpeg linked with the VP8/VP9 reference codec library libvpx can extract VP8 key frames from WebM media and a script can then add the WebP RIFF header and the NUL pad byte for odd frame lengths. Meanwhile, FFmpeg supports libwebp directly.

Gmail and Google Photos both support WebP. Support for WebP is also planned for Google App Engine. The Instant Previews feature of Google Search uses WebP internally to reduce disk space used by previews. Android 4.0 supports encoding and decoding WebP images (via bitmap and Skia). SDL_image supports the format since 1.2.11.

Telegram Messenger uses WebP for their Stickers, claiming they are displayed 5 times faster compared to the other formats usually used in messaging apps.

Signal uses WebP for their non-animated stickers.

LibreOffice supports the import of WebP images since version 7.4, so does the LibreOffice technology based online office Collabora Online.

Godot Engine as of version 4.0 supports importing and exporting WebP images and uses WebP as its internal format for storing imported compressed textures.

Content management systems (CMS) usually do not support WebP natively or by default. However, for most popular CMS, extensions are available for automated conversion from other image formats to WebP and delivering WebP images to compatible browsers. Since June 2021, WordPress supports WebP natively.

Restrictions 
Like VP8 on which it is based, former lossy WebP supports only 8-bit YUV 4:2:0 format, which may cause color loss on images with thin contrast elements (such as in pixel art and computer graphics) and ghosting in anaglyph. To overcome this restriction, new lossless WebP supports VP8L encoding that works exclusively with 8-bit RGBA (red, green, blue, alpha) color space.

However, due to the complexity of the compression, it is also significantly slower than other web image formats. It is therefore usually not advisable to process the images directly, as is the case with Web Map Services.

Criticism 

In September 2010, Fiona Glaser, a developer of the x264 encoder, wrote a very early critique of WebP. Comparing different encodings (JPEG, x264, and WebP) of a reference image, she stated that the quality of the WebP-encoded result was the worst of the three, mostly because of blurriness on the image. Her main remark was that "libvpx, a much more powerful encoder than ffmpeg's jpeg encoder, loses because it tries too hard to optimize for PSNR" (peak signal-to-noise ratio), arguing instead that "good psycho-visual optimizations are more important than anything else for compression".

In October 2013, Josh Aas from Mozilla Research published a comprehensive study of current lossy encoding techniques and was not able to conclude that WebP outperformed mozjpeg by any significant margin.

WebP 2 
Google has been developing the second version of WebP since June 2021. The main goal of this new format is to reach similar compression ratios as AVIF while remaining faster to encode and decode.

On October 12, 2022, Google changed WebP 2's development repository's README file to state that "WebP 2 will not be released as an image format" and began describing WebP 2 as a "playground for image compression experiments".

See also 
 Comparison of graphics file formats
 AVIF, an image format based on the AV1 video format
 BPG, an image format intended to be a more compression-efficient replacement for the JPEG image format, based on the intra-frame encoding of the High Efficiency Video Coding (HEVC) video compression standard, introduced in 2014.
 FLIF, a discontinued lossless image format which claimed to outperform PNG, lossless WebP, lossless BPG and lossless JPEG2000 in terms of compression ratio, introduced in 2015. FLIF was superseded by JPEG XL.
 HEIF, another image format based on HEVC.
 From the Joint Photographic Experts Group:
 JPEG-LS, an old but efficient lossless format, introduced in 1999.
 JPEG 2000, an improvement intended to replace the older JPEG by the JPEG committee, introduced in 2000.
 JPEG XR, an alternative to JPEG 2000 supporting HDR and wide gamut color spaces, introduced in 2009.
 JPEG XL, particularly optimised for responsive web environments, so that content renders well on a wide range of devices. Moreover, it includes several features that help transition from the legacy JPEG format. JPEG XL was introduced at the end of 2020.
 MNG and APNG, PNG-based animated image formats, supporting lossless 24-bit RGB color and 8-bit alpha channel.

References

External links 

 

Animated graphics file formats
Computer-related introductions in 2010
Google
Raster graphics file formats
Image compression
Open formats